Vols. 11 & 12 is the sixth compilation album by the desert rock supergroup Desert Sessions, a side project of Queens of the Stone Age frontman Josh Homme. It is a compilation of the group's eleventh release, titled Arrivederci Despair and their twelfth release, titled Tightwads & Nitwits & Critics & Heels. It was released in October 2019, the group's first release after a 16-year hiatus. The album features contributions by various rock artists including Billy Gibbons of ZZ Top, Stella Mozgawa of Warpaint, Jake Shears of Scissor Sisters, Mike Kerr of Royal Blood, Carla Azar of Autolux, Les Claypool of Primus, Matt Sweeney, Matt Berry, and Libby Grace.

Track listing

Personnel
Josh Homme - Lead vocals (tracks 2, 8), guitar (tracks 1, 2, 3, 4, 5, 6, 7), percussion (tracks 1, 4), harmony vocals (tracks 4, 7), choir vocals (track 4), synth (track 4), piano (tracks 3, 8), bass (2, 5, 7), production, mixing, engineering
Billy Gibbons - Lead vocals (track 1), guitar (track 2)
Stella Mozgawa - Drums (tracks 2, 6), synth (tracks 1, 3), percussion (tracks 1, 2)
Jake Shears - Lead vocals (track 7), backup vocals (tracks 1, 5, 6, 8), harmony vocals (track 8)
Mike Kerr - Lead vocals (track 5), guitar (track 8), acoustic guitar (track 7), bass (track 4), backup vocals (tracks 1, 8), percussion (tracks 1, 4), piano (track 8), choir vocals (track 4)
Carla Azar - Drums (tracks 1, 3, 4, 5, 7, 8), synth (tracks 1, 5), percussion (tracks 1, 3, 4, 8), steel drum (track 7), backup vocals (track 1), choir vocals (track 4)
Les Claypool - Bass (tracks 1, 2, 3)
Matt Sweeney - Guitar (tracks 1, 2, 3, 4, 5, 7, 8), acoustic guitar (track 4), backup vocals (tracks 1, 2, 8), percussion (tracks 1, 4), choir vocals (track 4)
Libby Grace - Lead vocals (tracks 4), harmony vocals (track 4), choir vocals (track 4)
Matt Berry - Organ (track 6), inner monologue vocals (track 6)
Dave Catching - Synth (track 8)
Töôrnst Hülpft  - Lead vocals (track 6)
Mark Rankin - Mixing (tracks 1, 4), engineering

Notes

External links
 Desert Session Official site
  Allmusic

References 

11
12
2019 compilation albums
Matador Records compilation albums
Albums produced by Josh Homme